JSE Limited (previously the JSE Securities Exchange and the Johannesburg Stock Exchange) is the largest stock exchange in Africa. It is located in Sandton, Johannesburg, South Africa, after it moved from downtown Johannesburg in 2000. In 2003 the JSE had an estimated 473 listed companies and a market capitalisation of US$182.6 billion (€158 billion), as well as an average monthly traded value of US$6.399 billion (€5.5 billion). As of March 2022, the market capitalisation of the JSE was at US$1.36 trillion.

History
The discovery of gold on the Witwatersrand in 1886 led to many mining and financial companies opening and a need soon arose for a stock exchange. The first share transactions on the Rand took place in a rustic canvas tent, with trade taking place on Sundays, as this was the only day when mining was not allowed, owing to a strictly enforced regulation prohibiting the entry of African workers to the gold reefs.

The Johannesburg Exchange & Chambers Company was established by a London businessman, Benjamin Minors Woollan and housed at the corner of Commissioner and Simmonds Streets. Out of this the JSE was born on 8 November 1887. What immediately gave the JSE a clear advantage over exchanges such as Kimberley, Barberton, and, most importantly, London, was that listing of companies for a quotation on the Official List of the JSE was an easy and relatively cheap procedure. This relatively simple and non-restricting nature of the early Exchange promoted a wave of initial registrations on the Official List, with 68 companies by the end of November 1887. The Official List further expanded to more than 300 companies by the end of January 1890.
By 1890 the trading hall became too small and had to be rebuilt but this too was outgrown. Trading then moved into the street. The Mining Commissioner closed off Simmonds Street between Market Square and Commissioner Street by means of chains.

In 1903, a new building was built for the JSE on Hollard Street. It was a storey building that took up an entire whole city block bounded by Fox and Main, Hollard and Sauer Streets.

After World War II, it became apparent that this building was again inadequate and in 1947 the decision was made to rebuild the stock exchange. It took 11 years before construction began and in February 1961 the second exchange at Hollard Street was officially opened. By 1963, the JSE became a member of the Federation International Bourses de Valeurs (FIBV).

In 1978, the JSE took up residence at 17 Diagonal Street near Kerk Street, Johannesburg. 1993 saw the JSE become an active member of the African Stock Exchanges Association. After 108 years, the open outcry system of trading was changed to an electronic system on 7 June 1996.

In September 2000, the Johannesburg Securities Exchange moved to its present location in Sandton, Gauteng at the corner of Maude Street and Gwen Lane. It adopted the JSE Securities Exchange as its new official name.

In 2001 an agreement was struck with the London Stock Exchange enabling cross-dealing between the two bourses and replacing the JSE's trading system with that of the LSE.

In 2009 the JSE acquired the Bond Exchange of South Africa for R240 million and rebranded it the JSE debt market adding South African government and corporate bonds as well as interest rate derivatives to its product set.

On 18 June 2012, the JSE became a founding member of the United Nations Sustainable Stock Exchanges initiative on the eve of the United Nations Conference on Sustainable Development (Rio+20).

On 14 April 2014, the JSE re-branded to demonstrates the bourse's identity as a modern African marketplace that connects investors to growth opportunities not only in South Africa but globally.

In May 2022, the JSE became the first exchange to come to market with a new service from provider xyt that would utilize peep group rankings to help trading firms explore market share and examine and view trading interactions and performance. It would be called JSE Trade Explorer.

About the JSE
The JSE provides a market where securities can be traded freely under a regulated procedure. It not only channels funds into the economy, but also provides investors with returns on investments in the form of dividends. The exchange successfully fulfils its main function—the raising of primary capital—by rechannelling cash resources into productive economic activity, thus building the economy while enhancing job opportunities and wealth creation.

The exchange is directed by an honorary committee of 16 people, all with full voting rights. The elected stockbroking members, who cannot number less than eight or more than eleven, may appoint an executive president and five outside members to the committee. Policy decisions are made by the committee and carried out by a full-time executive committee headed by the executive president.

The JSE is governed by its members but through their use of JSE services and facilities, these members are also customers of the Exchange. Each year the JSE must apply to the Minister of Finance for an operating license which vests external control of the exchange in the FSB.

JSE TradElect
The JSE's fully automated (electronic trading) trading system is called the Millennium Exchange, which replaced the JSE TradElect system in 2012, which in turn had replaced the JSE SETS system in April 2007, which had replaced the JSE JET system in May 2002.

The change to the Millennium Exchange involved moving the platform from London to a new platform housed in the JSE building in Johannesburg, thus speeding up the execution of transactions. The JSE operates an order-driven, central order book trading system with opening, intra-day and closing auctions.

Sens
In August 1997, the JSE launched the real-time Stock Exchange News Service (Sens) to enhance market transparency and investor confidence. Initially, it was optional for listed companies to use the service during its two-month trial period.

From 15 October, augmented JSE listing requirements oblige companies to disseminate any corporate news or price-sensitive information on the service prior to using any other media outlet. Sens is carried by all the major wire services.

Strate
Since its inception over ten years ago, Strate (Pty) Ltd has become the licensed South Africa's Central Securities Depository (CSD) for the electronic settlement of financial instruments in South Africa. Strate's stated core purpose is to mitigate risk, bring efficiencies to South African financial markets and improve its profile as an investment destination.

Strate handles the settlement of a number of securities, including equities and bonds for the Johannesburg Stock Exchange (JSE), as well as a range of derivative products such as warrants, exchange-traded funds (ETFs), retail notes and tracker funds. It has now added the settlement of money market securities to its portfolio of services. It provides services to issuers for their investors in terms of the Companies Act and Securities Services Act (SSA), 2004.

Hours
JSE's normal trading sessions are from 9:00am to 5:00pm on all weekdays except Saturdays, Sundays and holidays declared by the exchange in advance.

Listed companies

Alternative Exchange

The Alternative Exchange is a stock exchange that was founded as a division of the JSE in order to accommodate small- and medium-sized high growth companies. Its website is accessible from the front page of the JSE's main website. The Alternative Exchange is known as AltX.

Ownership
The bourse is operated by JSE Limited, a company that listed on its own main board in June 2006.

Fees and taxes
 Securities Transfer Tax (STT) 0.25%. Applies to share purchases only, not share sales.
 Strate 0.005787% (excluding VAT) based on the value of the share transactions:
Minimum R10.19 for trades with a value up to R176,000.
Maximum R73.49 for trades with a value over R1,270,000.
 FSCA Investor Protection Levy 0.0002% (excluding VAT) on all trades.

See also
 Cibecs (2009)
 Diamonds as an investment
 Gold as an investment
 Investment Analysts Society of Southern Africa
 South African Futures Exchange
 List of stock exchanges in the Commonwealth of Nations
 List of stock exchanges
 List of African stock exchanges
 South African Mineral Reporting Codes
 South African Institute of Stockbrokers
 South African Institute of Financial Markets
 A2X Markets

Further reading
Lukasiewicz, Mariusz. "From Diamonds to Gold: The Making of the Johannesburg Stock Exchange, 1880–1890." Journal of Southern African Studies 43.4 (2017). pp. 715–732
Klein, Harry. The story of the Johannesburg Stock Exchange: 1887-1947. Johannesburg: The Committee of the Johannesburg Stock Exchange. 1948
Rosenthal, Eric. On 'Change Through the Years: A History of Share Dealing in South Africa. Cape Town: Flesch Financial Publications. 1968

References

External links 

 
 JSE Alternative Exchange official website

Johannesburg Securities Exchange
Financial services companies established in 1887
Financial services companies of South Africa
Stock exchanges in South Africa
Economy of Johannesburg
Companies listed on the Johannesburg Stock Exchange